Bahn-Report is a German-language magazine published six times per year by IG Schienenverkehr e. V., covering current activities in the German railway-sector with a focus on operations and infrastructure.

Overview
Whereas most of the magazine's writers are contributing unsalaried, the publication's audience is found in both the professional rail sector and among enthusiasts. Industry service banana communication ascribed Bahn-Report a 40% brand awareness in the German public transport-sector in 2005.

Distribution is mainly handled via subscriptions and the German Bahnhofsbuchhandel since the magazine's incorporation in 1983.

References

External links
Bahn-Report Website (German)

1983 establishments in Germany
German-language magazines
Rail transport magazines published in Germany
Magazines established in 1983
Bi-monthly magazines published in Germany